The Chauncey Hall Building is a building located in Racine, Wisconsin. It was added to the National Register of Historic Places in 1980.  It is located within the Historic Sixth Street Business District.

It is a three-story commercial building  in plan, with its long axis along Fourth Street. It was designed by E. Townsend Mix, architect of Milwaukee, for banker Chauncey Hall.

See also
Chauncey Hall House, also NRHP-listed in Racine

References

Buildings and structures in Racine, Wisconsin
Commercial buildings on the National Register of Historic Places in Wisconsin
Queen Anne architecture in Wisconsin
Commercial buildings completed in 1883
National Register of Historic Places in Racine County, Wisconsin